The Great Muta Final "Bye-Bye" was a professional wrestling event promoted by CyberFight's sub-brand Pro Wrestling Noah. It took place on January 22, 2023, in Yokohama, Japan, at the Yokohama Arena. The event aired on CyberAgent's AbemaTV online linear television service and CyberFight's streaming service Wrestle Universe. 

The event was focused on the final match of Keiji Muto's "The Great Muta" character.

Storylines
The event featured nine professional wrestling matches that involved different wrestlers from pre-existing scripted feuds and storylines. Wrestlers portray villains, heroes, or less distinguishable characters in scripted events that build tension and culminate in a wrestling match or series of matches.

Event

Preliminary matches 
The show started with Kongo (Hajime Ohara and Hi69) defeating Atsushi Kotoge and Seiki Yoshioka. The second match saw Jungle Kyona and Ice Ribbon's Saori Anou picking up a victory Nomads (Sumire Natsu and Maya Yukihi). Next, Timothy Thatcher defeated Masaaki Mochizuki in singles action. The fourth bout saw Junta Miyawaki, Alejandro and Yasutaka Yano win their match against the team of Yoshinari Ogawa, Eita and Nosawa Rongai via disqualification due to Ogawa, Eita and Nosawa tearing off Alejandro's mask. In the fifth match, Good Looking Guys (Jake Lee, Jack Morris and Anthony Greene) defeated Masa Kitamiya, Daiki Inaba and Yoshiki Inamura. Next, Kazushi Sakuraba defeated Hideki Suzuki by referee stoppage in a Sugiura-gun intern stable clash GHC martial arts rules match. The seventh bout saw Amakusa, Último Dragón and Ninja Mack (with Sonny Onoo) defeateing Yo-Hey, Kzy and Dante Leon. In the eighth bout, Kaito Kiyomiya, El Hijo de Dr. Wagner Jr., Takashi Sugiura and Satoshi Kojima defeated Kongo (Kenoh, Katsuhiko Nakajima, Masakatsu Funaki and Manabu Soya) in eight-man tag team action.

Main event 
In the main event, The Great Muta teamed up with All Elite Wrestling's (AEW) Sting and Darby Allin, all three of them being accompanied to the ring by The Great Kabuki. The team succeeded in pulling a victory against Hakushi, Akira and Naomichi Marufuji. This was Muta's final Noah appearance. In addition, it was also the final match in his "Great Muta" character.

Results

References

External links 

 Pro Wrestling Noah official website

Pro Wrestling Noah
CyberAgent
2023 in professional wrestling
January 2023 events in Japan
Professional wrestling in Tokyo
Pro Wrestling Noah shows